Phulwari is a large Indian village in Palwal district of Haryana state.

References

Villages in Palwal district